Zhongsa Village is an administrative village under the jurisdiction of Zhongsha Township, Gongbo'gyamda County, Nyingchi City, Tibet. The grassroots mass autonomous organization in which the village is located is the Zhongsa Villagers' Committee,  whose zoning code is 540421202203.

References

Populated places in Nyingchi